is a 2006 Japanese animated science fiction psychological thriller film directed by Satoshi Kon.
The film is based on the 1993 novel of the same name by Japanese author Yasutaka Tsutsui. 
It is Kon's fourth and final feature film before his death in 2010.
The script was co-written by Kon and Seishi Minakami, who also wrote for Kon's TV series Paranoia Agent, the character design and animation director was Masashi Ando (known for Princess Mononoke, Spirited Away, Your Name), the music was composed by Kon's frequent collaborator Susumu Hirasawa, and the art director was Nobutaka Ike, who has worked on all of Kon's works. 
Japanese animation studio Madhouse animated and produced the film. 
The Japanese voice cast featured Megumi Hayashibara, Tōru Emori, Katsunosuke Hori, Tōru Furuya, Akio Ōtsuka, Kōichi Yamadera, and Hideyuki Tanaka.

The story is about a battle between a dream terrorist who steals a device that allows others to share their dreams and causes nightmares for people, and a research psychologist who enters the dream world and changes into Paprika, a dream detective, to investigate the cases.

The film was released in Japan on November 25, 2006, and was later released in North America on May 24, 2007.
It was also in competition at the 63rd Venice International Film Festival. Critical reception was generally positive.

Plot
In the near future, a newly created device called the "DC Mini" allows the user to view people's dreams. The head of the team working on this treatment, Doctor Atsuko Chiba, begins using the machine illegally to help psychiatric patients outside the research facility, by assuming her dream world alter-ego/other personality "Paprika". Chiba's closest allies are Doctor Toratarō Shima, the chief of the department, and Doctor Kōsaku Tokita, the inventor of the DC Mini.

Paprika counsels Detective Toshimi Konakawa, who is plagued by a recurring dream. She gives Konakawa a card with the name of a website on it. Because they are unfinished prototypes, the DC Minis lack access restrictions, allowing anyone to enter another person's dreams, which poses grave consequences when they are stolen. Shima goes on a nonsensical tirade and jumps through a window, nearly killing himself. Upon examining Shima's dream, which is a parade of random objects, Tokita recognizes his assistant, Kei Himuro, which confirms their suspicion that the theft was an inside job.

When two other scientists fall victim to the DC Mini, the company's chairman, Doctor Seijirō Inui, who was against the project to begin with, bans the use of the device. This fails to hinder the crazed parade, now inside Himuro's dream, which claims Tokita. Paprika and Shima discover that Himuro is only an empty shell. The real culprit is Inui, who believes that he must protect dreams from humankind's influence through dream therapy, with the help of Doctor Morio Osanai.

Paprika is captured by the pair after an exhausting chase. Osanai obsessively confesses his love for Chiba and peels away Paprika's skin to reveal Chiba underneath. However, he is interrupted by the outraged Inui who demands that they finish off Chiba; as the two share Osanai's body, they battle for control. Konakawa enters the dream and flees with Chiba back into his own recurring dream. Osanai gives chase, which ends in Konakawa shooting Osanai to take control of the dream. The act kills Osanai's physical body in the real world.

Dreams and reality begin to merge. The dream parade runs amok in the city, and reality starts to unravel. Shima is nearly killed by a giant Japanese doll, but is saved by Paprika, who has become separate from Chiba. Amidst the chaos, Tokita, in the form of a giant robot, eats Chiba and prepares to do the same to Paprika. A ghostly apparition of Chiba appears and reveals that she has been in love with Tokita and has been repressing these emotions. She comes to terms with her repressed desires, reconciling herself with the part of her that is Paprika. Inui returns in the form of a giant humanoid nightmare, reveals his twisted dreams of omnipotence, and threatens to darken the world with his delusions. Paprika throws herself into Tokita's body. A baby emerges from the robotic shell and consumes Inui, aging into a fully-grown combination of Chiba and Paprika as she does so, then fades away, ending the nightmare.

In the final scene, Chiba sits at Tokita's bedside as he wakes up. Later, Konakawa visits the website from Paprika's card and receives a message from Paprika: "Atsuko will change her surname to Tokita...and I suggest watching the movie Dreaming Kids." Konakawa enters a movie theater and purchases a ticket for Dreaming Kids.

Voice cast
She uses the DC Mini to treat her clients inside their dreams under the guise of her alter ego . Chiba is voiced by Cindy Robinson in the English dub.
He is Chiba's closest ally, although she often treats him coldly. Tokita often calls Chiba "Atsu-chan" as a symbol of affection. Tokita is voiced by Yuri Lowenthal in the English dub.
Inui is voiced by Michael Forest in the English dub.
Shima is voiced by David Lodge in the English dub.
He is haunted by a recurring dream that stems from an anxiety neurosis. He is infatuated with Paprika. Konakawa is voiced by Paul St. Peter in the English dub.
He is obsessively in love with Chiba. Osanai is voiced by Doug Erholtz in the English dub.
 Hideyuki Tanaka as Guy.
 Satomi Kōrogi as a Japanese doll that reappears throughout the story.
 Daisuke Sakaguchi as Kei Himuro, a friend of Tokita and a suspect in the theft of the DC Mini. Himuro is voiced by Brian Beacock in the English dub.
 Mitsuo Iwata as Doctor Yasushi Tsumura.
 Rikako Aikawa as Doctor Nobue Kakimoto, two scientists who fall victim to the DC Mini thief.
 Yasutaka Tsutsui, the author of the novel the film is based on, as Kuga.
 Satoshi Kon, the director, as Jinnai, two bartenders who befriend Konakawa.

Music

The soundtrack was released on 23 November 2006 under the TESLAKITE label. It was composed by Susumu Hirasawa. A bonus movie was included with the CD.

The soundtrack is notable for being one of the first film scores to use Vocaloid (Lola as the "voicebank") for vocals. It's also the last of Hirasawa's albums where an Amiga computer was used for composition. All MIDI was sequenced through an Amiga 4000 running the Bars n Pipes program.

Production 
Due to the small scale of release, both Millennium Actress and Tokyo Godfathers had a hard time recouping their investment funds. However, Kon's name had become known among the film industry by the time of the Paprika project, and his reputation had already been established, so the film was produced.

After finishing his first film, Perfect Blue, Kon was planning to make his next film, Paprika, with the producer of the company that financed it, but the project was ruined when the company, Rex Entertainment, went bankrupt. However, the idea of Paprika was in Kon's mind as early as 1998, and his attempts to depict the ambiguities and shaky boundaries between "illusion and reality" and "memory and reality" in his directorial debut Perfect Blue and his original film Millennium Actress were actually because he wanted to visually portray a dynamic like the novel Paprika.

Later, when he met with the author, Yasutaka Tsutsui, and received his permission to make the film, Kon stated that he felt as if he had realized what he had always imagined.

Unlike Perfect Blue, which was also based on a novel, Kon didn't change the fundamental parts of the original in Paprika, but he did change some parts of the novel to fit the movie. For two reasons, Kon thought that the original could not be adapted into a movie. One reason was that the novel Paprika was too voluminous to fit into a single film, and the other reason was that over ten years had already passed since the novel was published, and many creators had already embodied the ideas inspired by Paprika in various media, not just in films. Therefore, Kon decided to first make the original into a simple form, and then incorporate ideas from the original as well as from Tsutsui's other works into the frame. Kon believed that the charm of the original lay in the dream scenes, and that the film would only be complete if the dream world was portrayed in rich detail with expressions that he believed only visual images could provide. The descriptions of dreams in the novel were supplemented by explanations in the text. However, in the case of visual works, which show the images of dreams flowing one after another, explanation would hinder the flow.

In order to create a glamorous image for the entire film and still devote enough time to portraying the dream scenes without introducing the characters, Kon, in contrast to the previous film, used voice actors who were well known for their voice acting and whom he deemed to fit the characters' image.

The budget was approximately 300 million yen, and the production took about two and a half years from planning to completion.

Theme 
Like other Kon's works, this film uses the motif of "fiction and reality" to depict a world in which seamlessly connected dreams and reality are violently switched, and the boundary between fiction and reality becomes indistinct, in a uniquely realistic manner.

For Kon, "fiction" and "reality" are not opposing concepts, but both are homogeneous in the sense that they are both "painted things," and the only thing that separates the two is "what is drawn there."
Kon rarely traced real scenes when he drew, and he wanted his pictures to be more abstract than realistic, so that they would "look like that."
In other words, the screen full of reality that the audience feels as if it is real is just a "picture" for Kon, and because it is animation, there is essentially no distinction between reality and fiction in its expression.
This gap is what gives birth to the "tricks" that support Satoshi Kon's works.
The relationship between "fiction and reality" in Kon's work is that real pictures that make you forget that they are pictures are "reality" first, and then arrange them in the same position as reality and fiction in the form of "actually this was a picture (fiction)", and it is an illusion unique to anime.
However, what makes this work different from Kon's other works is that it has a deeper relationship between "dream" and "reality," where "dream" and "reality" are each transformed into the existence of the other.
In the film, the "dream" is represented as a "distorted reality reflecting the unconscious desires of the dreamer," and the trick is to transform the "reality" into the "dream" by adding distortions at the level of the picture, and the "dream" into the "reality" by correcting the distortions.

In this film, Kon's core theme is the duality, multifacetedness, contrast, and the balance between them, which he intentionally incorporated into the film from the beginning.
The relationship between Atsuko and Paprika is one of contrast and duality within the same person, but the characterization and arrangement of the other characters follows the same idea.

The parade of inanimate "nightmares" depicted in the film is not found in the novel, and was entirely Kon's idea.
With the time limitation of the film, it was difficult to portray various dreams in different ways as in the original, so Kon decided to focus on a dream image that would be symbolic throughout the film and that would be instantly recognizable as a nightmare when it appeared.
According to Kon, the parade scene was something that he and Susumu Hirasawa, who produced the music, created together.

Release

Festivals
Paprika premiered on 2 September 2006, at the 63rd Venice Film Festival. It screened at the 44th New York Film Festival, playing on 7 October 2006. It competed at the 19th Tokyo International Film Festival 21–29 October 2006, as the opening screening for the 2006 TIFF Animation CG Festival. It also competed in 27th Fantasporto from 23 February to 3 March 2007. Paprika was shown at the 2007 National Cherry Blossom Festival in Washington, D.C., as the closing film of the Anime Marathon at the Freer Gallery of the Smithsonian, and at the 2007 Greater Philadelphia Cherry Blossom Festival. It played at the Sarasota Film Festival on 21 April 2007, in Sarasota, Florida. Additionally, it was shown at the 39th International Film Festival in Auckland, New Zealand, on 22 July 2007, and was shown as the festival travelled around New Zealand.

Distribution 
Paprika was distributed in Japan by Sony Pictures Entertainment Japan, the same company that distributed the previous film Tokyo Godfathers, and ran from November 25, 2006 until March 2007.
The film was first released in November in three limited theaters in Kantō region, and it drew a total of 2,210 people and grossed 3,460,500 yen ($30,000 at the exchange rate at the time) on its first two days, and a total of 71,236 people and 100 million yen ($870,000) in January of the following year, the eighth week of its release.

In the United States, the film received a limited release on May 24, 2007, with Sony Pictures Classics distributing the film.
It was initially released in only two theaters, in New York City and Los Angeles, but was gradually expanded to show on up to 37 screens simultaneously.
However, the total number of theaters far exceeded that, eventually reaching over 80.
It was rare for Japanese anime to be released theatrically in the U.S. and almost no releases in the entire U.S., which requires 2,000 to 4,000 theaters, so even though it was a limited release, the scale of over 80 theaters was quite large.

Box office
The film grossed $882,267 in the United States. 
In other territories, the film grossed $62,648 in Singapore, Italy and South Korea , for an overseas total of $944,915 outside of Japan.

Reception

Critical reception

Paprika has received positive reviews from film critics. It holds an 85% "Certified Fresh" approval rating on the review aggregator website Rotten Tomatoes, based on 91 reviews, with an average rating of 7.30/10 and the consensus reading, "Following its own brand of logic, Paprika is an eye-opening mind trip that is difficult to follow but never fails to dazzle." Metacritic, which assigns a weighted average score, rated the film 81 out of 100 based on 26 critic reviews, indicating "universal acclaim". Paprika won the Best Feature Length Theatrical Anime Award at the sixth-annual Tokyo Anime Awards during the 2007 Tokyo International Anime Fair.

Andrez Bergen of Yomiuri Shimbun praised the Paprika as the "most mesmerizing animation long-player since Miyazaki's Spirited Away five years ago" (in 2001). He also praised the film's animation and backgrounds. Mick LaSalle of the San Francisco Chronicle gave it a positive review, saying that the film is a "sophisticated work of the imagination" and "challenging and disturbing and uncanny in the ways it captures the nature of dreams". LaSalle later went on to say that the film is a "unique and superior achievement." Rob Nelson of The Village Voice praised the film for its visuals. However, he complained about the plot, saying that Paprika is not "a movie that's meant to be understood so much as simply experienced - or maybe dreamed." Nelson later went on to say that Kon "maintains a charming faith in cinema's ability to seduce fearless new (theater) audiences, even one viewer at a time." Manohla Dargis of The New York Times said that the film has a "sense of unease about the rapidly changing relationship between our physical selves and our machines." Dargis praised Kon for his direction, saying that he "shows us the dark side of the imaginative world in Paprika that he himself has perceptively brightened." Helen McCarthy in 500 Essential Anime Movies said that Paprika "proves once again that the great science fiction doesn't rely on giant robots and alien worlds".

Conversely, Roger Moore of the Orlando Sentinel gave a negative review, saying "With a conventional invade-dreams/bend-reality plot, it's a bit of a bore. It's not as dreamlike and mesmerizing as Richard Linklater's rotoscope-animation Waking Life, less fanciful than the Oscar-winning anime Spirited Away." Bruce Westbrook of the Houston Chronicle said the film "is as trippy as a Jefferson Airplane light show" and criticized the characters and the dialogue.

According to a French magazine, Christopher Nolan has cited Paprika as an influence on his 2010 feature film, Inception. The Lord of the Rings and Eternal Sunshine of the Spotless Mind actor Elijah Wood praised the film in an interview, Time magazine included it in its top 25 animated films of all time, while Time Out also included the film in its list of top 50 animated films of all time. Rotten Tomatoes included it in its list of fifty best animated films of all time. Newsweek Japan included Paprika in its list of the 100 best films of all time, while the American edition of Newsweek included it among its top twenty films of 2007. Metacritic has listed the film among the top 25 highest-rated science fiction films of all time, and the top 30 highest-rated animations of all time.

Awards and nominations
Paprika received the following awards and nominations:

Legacy

Live-action adaptation
A live-action adaptation of Paprika, to be directed by Wolfgang Petersen, was in development in 2009. However, since then, there has not been any significant update to whether it will be produced. In August 2022, it was reported that Cathy Yan would direct and executive produce a live-action television adaptation for Amazon Studios.

Inception
Several critics and scholars have noted many striking similarities that later appeared in the 2010 Christopher Nolan film Inception, including plot similarities, similar scenes, and similar characters, arguing that Inception was influenced by Paprika. Ciara Wardlow of Film School Rejects argues that Inception was influenced by Paprika based on similarities too numerous to be coincidence, from "the focus on dream sharing technology to Ariadne’s wardrobe to references to Greek mythology, physics-defying hallways, significant dream-elevators, and the choice of having a Japanese businessman (Saito) be the one to hire Cobb and the dream team, among other things". Patrick Drazen said at least "one scene is a clean and undeniable link: in the climactic dream sequence, when Paprika is trying to escape the chairman and his helper, she defies gravity by running across the wall instead of the floor." Julian Rizzo-Smith of IGN claims that "Nolan drew upon famous scenery of Paprika", noting striking similarities such as "the ever-stretching long hallway where Toshimi witnesses a murder, and the visual effect of the dream world shattering like glass." Joshua Horner of WhatCulture claims that "Nolan was inspired by Paprika" and adds that there are strikingly similar scenes where Paprika and Ariadne both "enter an elevator with each floor representing another layer of the host's subconscious."

Alistair Swale, while uncertain whether Nolan "appropriated elements of Paprika directly," notes striking similarities between them, such as both exploring similar themes of "computer technology enabling people to enter the realm of the subconscious and experience time on multiple levels", and notes their similarities are comparable to that which exists between Ghost in the Shell and The Matrix. Steven Boone of Politico said he suspects Paprika "was on Nolan's list of homages" and compares it favourably with Inception, arguing that "Kon confronts his tormented society with visual poetry, not just a remix of tropes and set pieces" and that Paprika "goes deep, where Inception just talks of depth and darkness but, as a screen experience, sticks with glib pyrotechnics". French film site Excessif claimed in 2010 that Nolan cited Paprika as an influence on Elliot Page's character Ariadne in the film, a claim repeated by Phil de Semlyen of Empire, but Film School Rejects and Anime News Network note that no direct quote from Nolan was given to support this claim.

See also
 False awakening
 Lucid dream
 The Lathe of Heaven

Notes and references

Notes

References

Bibliography

External links

  (US)
  (Japan)
 
 
 
 
 
 

2006 films
2006 anime films
2006 action thriller films
2000s action adventure films
2006 psychological thriller films
2006 science fiction action films
2000s Japanese-language films
Japanese action adventure films
Japanese action thriller films
Japanese psychological thriller films
Japanese science fiction action films
Japanese science fiction thriller films
Japanese animated films
Japanese animated science fiction films
Anime films based on novels
Magic realism films
Films about dreams
Films about nightmares
Films about telepresence
Metafictional works
Films based on Japanese novels
Films based on science fiction novels
Films directed by Satoshi Kon
Films set in Japan
Cyberpunk films
Japanese science fiction adventure films
Cyberpunk anime and manga
Psychological thriller anime and manga
Madhouse (company)
Sony Pictures Classics animated films
Sony Pictures Entertainment Japan films
2000s American films